The South American Qualification Tournament for the 2020 Men's Olympic Volleyball Tournament was a volleyball tournament for men's national teams held in Mostazal, Chile from 10 to 12 January 2020. 4 teams played in the tournament and the winners Venezuela qualified for the 2020 Summer Olympics.

Qualification
The top four teams from the 2019 South American Championship which had not yet qualified to the 2020 Summer Olympics qualified for the tournament. Final standings of the 2019 South American Championship are shown in brackets.

 (3)
 (4)
 (5)
 (6)

Venue
 Gran Arena Monticello, Mostazal, Chile

Pool standing procedure
 Number of matches won
 Match points
 Sets ratio
 Points ratio
 Result of the last match between the tied teams

Match won 3–0 or 3–1: 3 match points for the winner, 0 match points for the loser
Match won 3–2: 2 match points for the winner, 1 match point for the loser

Round robin
All times are Chile Summer Time (UTC−03:00).

|}

|}

Final standing

Qualifying team for Summer Olympics

See also
Volleyball at the 2020 Summer Olympics – Women's South American qualification

References

External links
Official website – FIVB
Official website – CSV
Final Standing

2020 in volleyball
Volleyball qualification for the 2020 Summer Olympics
2020 in Chilean sport
Sports competitions in Chile
International volleyball competitions hosted by Chile
January 2020 sports events in South America